Nia Roberts may refer to:

Nia Roberts (actress) (born 1972), Welsh actress
Nia Roberts (presenter), Welsh radio and television presenter